Dean Seymour (born December 8, 1971) is a Canadian former professional ice hockey player. He played in the Finnish SM-liiga with KalPa during the 1997–98 season.

He is currently a Peewee Tier 1 coach in the Greater Saskatoon Hockey League.

Awards and honors

References

External links

1971 births
Living people
Canadian ice hockey centres
Fresno Falcons players
GCK Lions players
Hammarby Hockey (1921–2008) players
HC Thurgau players
Ice hockey people from Saskatchewan
IK Oskarshamn players
Iserlohn Roosters players
KalPa players
Louisiana IceGators (ECHL) players
Louisville RiverFrogs players
Northern Michigan Wildcats men's ice hockey players
Odense Bulldogs players
SC Herisau players
Sportspeople from Saskatoon
Canadian expatriate ice hockey players in Finland